The Volkswagen EcoRacer is a Volkswagen concept car first shown to the public at the 2005 Tokyo Motor Show. It was designed by Cesar Muntada, a Barcelona born designer, who previously worked in the Design Center of PSA Peugeot and of Honda. Muntada is also the acclaimed author of the successful project "Showdown", a Harley-Davidson based concept bike allotted to be made by 2020.

Performance
The average fuel consumption is 3.4 liters per 100 km (70 miles per gallon).

Engine
It has a diesel powered, turbocharged internal combustion engine with a displacement of 1.5 L. Despite the small displacement, it delivers one hundred kilowatts (136 hp) with 250 N·m of torque at 1900 rpm. The engine is of the common rail type, which is more efficient and quieter than the conventional rotary pump injection systems. It is equipped with a particulate matter filter. The engine is linked to a Direct-Shift Gearbox (DSG) with seven gears, and is a mid mount in front of the rear axle

The car
The EcoRacer seats two people, and has a small luggage compartment. The body is made of carbon fibre, which resulted in a relatively low weight of 850 kilograms (approximately 1875 lb). The car is a veritable transformer, with three modes: coupe, roadster (no roof) and speedster (no a pillar/windscreen).

External links
ECORacer concept info as archived 2008-08-15
Pictures of the EcoRacer

EcoRacer